Carl Adolph Feilberg (21 August 1844 – 25 October 1887) was a Danish-born Australian journalist, newspaper editor, and general political commentator, who is today best known as an Australian indigenous human-rights activist.

Biography

Life

Carl Feilberg was born on 21 August 1844 in a small apartment at 1 Bredgade in Copenhagen, Denmark. He was the first born and only son of Danish Royal Navy lieutenant, Christen Schifter Feilberg and Louise Adelaide Feilberg. Louise Feilberg was the daughter of a planter on the island of St. Croix in the then Danish West Indies. Feilberg's second name was spelled Adolph in his birth record and on most contemporary publications for public use, but he frequently used Adolf with 'f' as his personal signature. Following the early death of both parents Feilberg was placed in foster care with Danish relatives, his aunt Louise Stegman (née Brummer) and her husband graingrocer Conrad Stegmann at the time living in Edinburgh, Scotland. Thus Feilberg came to receive his formal education in Scotland, finalising with a year at a college in France. Following his graduation he was employed by a shipping insurance broker, Lloyd's of London.

Suffering from a serious case of tuberculosis Fielberg was advised to migrate to Australia where time spent in the dry interior might mitigate some of the symptoms and provide a chance for survival. He arrived in Sydney from London on the Aberdeen vessel "Sir John Lawrence" on 18 June 1867 travelling onto Rockhampton carrying a 'letter of introduction' to the Scottish squatter Archibald Berdmore Buchanan. He then gained 'colonial experience' working as a shepherd, store and book keeper predominantly at Buchanan's properties. The first six months at Cardbeign station in Springsure district, the remaining time in the Barcoo district on Greendale and possibly other stations in the central west. The knowledge he gained in the outback including his experiences with the Native Police and the darker sides of the colony's frontier policies, would later influence his work as a journalist, political commentator, author.

Naturalised at Rockhampton Court House 21 June 1870 Feilberg chose to settle in Maryborough where in August he commenced a career in journalism. Initially assisting Ebenezer Thorne on his newly launched three-weekly Wide Bay and Burnett News. In November 1870 after a series of libel cases and family issues Thorne sold his share in the journal to Carl Feilberg who became the sole editor and proprietor. Feilberg as editor supported the struggle for manhood suffrage, his success in breaking the press monopoly of William Henry Walsh.  On 15 May 1872 he married Tasmanian born, Clara Smith at the Presbyterian Church in Maryborough. She was the daughter of the engineer and proprietor of Kilkivan Mine, Walter Smith and Clara Susannah Smith. After leaving Maryborough he was employed by the Brisbane Courier as a political commentator, leader writer as the editor of its  weekly, The Queenslander, from January 1879 to December 1880.

The personal and political fallout following the below mentioned campaign of the Queenslander in 1880 subsequently caused Feilberg to accept a position as sub-editor on the then leading Victorian journal the Argus in June 1882. It was cautiously noted in the contemporary Press that Feilberg 'has had very definite political opinions, and, in labouring unremittingly to impress them upon the public mind, has suffered at various times from the misrepresentation and obloquy which every active politician is fated to encounter'. The background was a change in the proprietorship of the Brisbane Newspaper Company in late December 1880 which caused Feilberg to endure a year of being gradually relegated to steadily more subordinate positions on the journal. Later commenting privately on this experience he was naturally more upfront. Thus on 23 September 1882, in a private letter in reply to Sir Arthur Gordon, the former Governor and High Commissioner of the Western Pacific, Feilberg wrote: 'I despair of doing much good for the blacks, and I have incurred enough personal ill will myself by writing on their behalf during my residence in Queensland.' Indeed, it may be fairly said that he was politically exiled or finally decided to exile himself from Queensland at that point in time. Yet he ‘was never physically a robust man’,  as one obituary stated. The illness that brought him to Australia in the first place remained dormant and the move to Melbourne proved fatal for him. The ‘climate’ of Melbourne ‘did not suit him’, it was later said, what started out as a cold was to revive his old ailment and his days were numbered by mid-1883. He gave in to an offer and returned to Brisbane in July to subsequently take on the position of editor-in-chief of the Brisbane Newspaper Company (Brisbane Courier and its weekly The Queenslander, now The Courier-Mail) in September same year. He remained fully active in this position until a few weeks before his death at his home 'Claraville' in Cordelia Street South Brisbane on 25 October 1887.

Rather paradoxically for a person who has been almost totally forgotten by posterity, the announcement of Feilberg's death triggered a quite unprecedented reaction in the contemporary press. His passing thus resulted in obituaries and memorial notices throughout Queensland and in all leading journals in Australia, hinting at the controversies he had once triggered and honouring his compassionate nature in glowing words and phrases. Indeed, the coverage and wording of these articles by far exceeds those honouring the passing of any of his contemporary and in many cases more famous colleagues. His funeral at Brisbane's Toowong Cemetery was similarly attended by a wide range of friends, journalists and several high-ranking politicians from both sides of Queensland politics including  the former Premier, Sir Thomas McIlwraith. A eulogy was authored by poet Francis Adams.

Career
Feilberg commenced his career in journalism as the owner-editor of the Wide Bay and Burnett News from November 1870 to about 1875, free-lance correspondent and occasional editorial writer for the Brisbane Courier and Queenslander and other journals, editor of the Cooktown Courier from September 1876 to June 1877, Hansard shorthand writer from July to October 1877, part proprietor and editor of the Queensland Patriot/Daily News from March 1878 to early January 1879. From there on he became the key political commentator and leader writer for the Brisbane Courier and editor of the Queenslander from January 1879 to December 1880, sub-editor on the Melbourne Argus from June 1882 to June 1883, editor-in-chief of the Brisbane Courier and its weekly the Queenslander from September 1883 to October 1887. Feilberg additionally wrote many short stories and sketches reflecting the life and dreams of many of his fellow colonists. His journalism covered a wide range of subjects amongst which parliamentary business, railway and settlement policy, finance and economic policy and indigenous rights, took a prominent position. Beyond being additionally a harsh critic of the Kanaka trade (see below), he was an eager advocate for settlements in the interior and railway schemes supporting this, he questioned the uncontrolled Chinese immigration (during the great mining rush in the far north), and he was a strong advocate of laws to combat the threat to the environment of uncontrolled logging and deforestation and securing a policy of sustainable foresting. The Liberal Premier John Douglas (Queensland politician) appointed him as government envoy for New Guinea during the New Guinea gold-rush in early 1878, and New Guinea was later a frequent subject for his numerous editorials.

Carl Feilberg served several terms as president for Brisbane's famed literary Johnsonian Club.  Other chairmen over time were noted Queenslanders such as jurist Sir Samuel Griffith, politician John Douglas, poet James Brunton Stephens, and journalist William Senior the principal short hand writer also known as 'Red Spinner'.  The latter three in particular were known to be close friends of Feilberg.

Human rights and Aboriginal people

Carl Feilberg was the hitherto anonymous journalist, editor and author behind the Queenslander'''s newspaper campaign and pamphlet The Way We Civilise; Black and White; The Native Police (published in Brisbane, December 1880) characterised by Henry Reynolds as "...one of the most influential political tracts in Australian history..."

Beyond his other work, Feilberg thus notably authored a great number of articles on the issue of human rights abuses towards islanders and indigenous people in Queensland. The issue of the so-called Kanaka trade or Blackbirding – the use of Melanesian labour on Queensland sugar plantations – was high on his agenda from the late 1870 onwards; he and his journal were thus instrumental in bringing about the conviction of the Captain of the recruiting schooner "Jason" in 1871.

Feilberg's contribution to the history of colonial Queensland included editorials written for the Brisbane Courier from 1874 to 1878 and later in the Cooktown Courier during January to March 1877, and two newspaper campaigns strongly critical of Queensland's frontier indigenous policies. The first of these campaigns was conducted in the independent liberal journal the Queensland Patriot prior to the police estimates for 1879 being tabled in the Legislative Assembly. The move was daring but ultimately unsuccessful although it triggered a parliamentary debate on 10 July 1878. Yet the blue-print for this small campaign was then reused, commissioned by the managing editor of the Brisbane Newspaper Company, Gresley Lukin (1840–1916), on a much larger scale in the leading Queensland journal the Brisbane Courier (now The Courier-Mail) two years later. In the nine months from during March to December 1880 Feilberg utilised its weekly, the Queenslander, as a platform to launch a series of powerfully worded editorials and articles demanding a Royal Commission and a change of policy. Yet again unsuccessful, he nonetheless managed to trigger two large parliamentary debates and the biggest public debate of its kind ever conducted by an Australian newspaper, on this subject.

It was parts of the latter debate which were reissued as a pamphlet in December 1880.

Feilberg outlined some of his deeper feelings in an editorial printed in the Queenslander on 19 January 1878, saying amongst other things that the

...complacent blindness which induces the natives of Europe to regard their own customs and institutions as excellent above compare, and their adoption as a certain remedy and advantageous substitute for all other manners of living, even to the most simple and Arcadian, has served as excuse for enormities at the contemplation of which humanity revolts...

His opening lines to the campaign of the Queenslander on 1 May 1880, in his best known and most frequently cited editorial headed The Way We Civilise, it famously outlined Queensland's policy towards Aboriginal people in the following manner:

This, in plain language, is how we deal with the aborigines: On occupying new territory the aboriginal inhabitants are treated exactly in the same way as the wild beasts or birds the settlers may find there. Their lives and their property, the nets, canoes, and weapons which represent as much labour to them as the stock and buildings of the white settler, are held by the Europeans as being at their absolute disposal. Their goods are taken, their children forcibly stolen, their women carried away, entirely at the caprice of the white men. The least show of resistance is answered by a rifle bullet; in fact, the first introduction between blacks and whites is often marked by the unprovoked murder of some of the former – in order to make a commencement of the work of ‘civilising’ them.

The memory of this crucial part of Feilberg's writings, however, was to remain victim to the 'veil of silence' which covered all issues related to the treatment of indigenous people in the colonial era for the most part of a century. To the extent Feilberg's name was remembered at all, it was for his advocacy of some restrictions being put on Chinese immigration and for him being an early opponent of the Kanaka labour-trade; issues which were clearly viewed as more acceptable by early nineteenth-century Australian historians and record keepers. Yet Feilberg's commitment to human rights was hinted at in various ways by some of his obituary writers and close friends.

Legacy of a pamphlet

Carl Feilberg's 1880 pamphlet played a crucial behind the scene role in the British Government move to nullify Queensland's unilateral annexation of New Guinea in April 1883. It was actively used by Sir Arthur Gordon (Arthur Hamilton-Gordon, 1st Baron Stanmore 1829–1912), the Aborigines Protection Society and others, as evidence to persuade the British Prime Minister William Ewart Gladstone (1809–1898) and his Secretary of State for the Colonies, Lord Derby, that Queensland was utterly unfit for the task of ruling New Guinea. Carl Feilberg's writings and opponents of the same are now frequently cited in a great number of books and documentaries. Lengthy quotes can be found in books dealing generally with Queensland's colonial history, such as Ross Fitzgerald's From the Dreaming to 1915 (1982) and Wm. Ross Johnston's A Documentary History of Queensland (1988). Similar quotes and references can be found in a number of books dealing generally with race relations in colonial Australia, such as Henry Reynolds' famous study, The Other Side of the Frontier (1981), Sharman Stone's documentary on Aborigines in White Australia (1974), and in a variety of studies, books and articles similarly dealing with this subject. It is used as a reference in more popular outlines such as Bruce Elder's Blood on the Wattle (1988), and quotes appear in virtually all TV documentaries on the subject. And, it is naturally well represented in studies dealing specifically with Queensland's race relations' history such as Raymond Evans in Exclusion, Exploitation and Extermination (Brisbane 1975), the Reynolds edited Race Relations in North Queensland (1978), Noel Loos' Invasion and Resistance (1982) and Pamela Lukin Watson's Frontier Lands & Pioneer Legends (1998). It was cited in Judith Wright's The Cry for the Dead (1981) and more recently in Roslyn Poignant's Professional Savages (2004). Gordon Reid's That Unhappy Race, (Melbourne 2006), p. 115-16, 125–127, 230, The satirical title The Way We Civilise was eventually re-used in 1997 as a title for Rosalind Kidd's study on Queensland's institutionalised policy towards Aboriginal people onwards from the 1880s to more recent times. Feilberg's pamphlet is equally cited in the highly profiled Bringing Them Home or 'stolen generation report' (1997), about Aboriginal children forcibly removed from their families to be brought up in institutions during the twentieth century, and in Ben Kiernan's Blood and Soil: A World History of Genocide and Extermination (2008).

Those who knew him
William Henry Traill, journalist and Feilberg's predecessor as editor of the Queenslander, who was later the editor of the Sydney Mail, owner-editor of the famed weekly magazine The Bulletin and a NSW politician, was the only one of Feilberg's friends who dared to mention Feilberg's feelings on the question of indigenous rights (possibly because Traill was living in Sydney at the time), saying:

I knew him well during the time he was for a while a journalistic free-lance, before he went on to the staff of the Courier or Argus, and if ever a man lived to falsify the popular idea of a ‘bohemian,’ he was the man. So far as bohemianism is supposed to comprehend a spirit of universal charity, of hatred of tyranny and cant, and of a most intense love for his profession, he was a thorough ‘bohemian’; but of the other side of the character, the reckless improvidence, dissipation, and contempt of respectability, he was as free as that great type, the ‘British Merchant of the old school.’ As a journalist he was an untiring worker, few newspapers in Australia have not been benefited by his pen, and few writers on all subjects were more appreciated by the public, he never wrote himself out, and his style was always fresh and free from any touch of respective sameness...Poor Feilberg! There were two subjects on which one could always rouse his righteous indignation – the treatment of the blacks, and the seizure of the Danish fleet by Nelson; his love of fair play was too strongly appealed to in both...

Somewhat a political opponent, yet nonetheless a close personal friend, Walter John Morley (1848–1937) then the editor-in-chief of the Brisbane Evening Observer wrote about Feilberg that he was "...a man whom it was impossible to regard with indifference." Adding further that Feilberg, 'in his working days', was

... one of the most voluminous and valued of Australian writers … There is hardly a newspaper of note in the Southern hemisphere for which he has not written … As a Press writer Mr. Feilberg was without a rival in the colony, and had few equals on the continent. His style was clear, crisp, and trenchant, and withal somewhat cynical; he could detect at once the weak spot of an argument, and understood thoroughly the worth of ridicule and the power of satire. His writings exhibit a perfect knowledge of the country, and of country life, and betray a sympathy with human nature for which those who saw only his other writings would never credit him. … His views were naturally extreme, for he was intense, as such men always are, and this extremeness, with the vigour of his enunciation, caused him to make many and bitter enemies. Probably there were few men in the colony more bitterly hated by political and social opponents, yet there was certainly no man more beloved by those whose privilege it was to know him intimately. For underneath all his cynicism and his apparent vindictiveness beat a heart that overflowed with all that makes humanity noble and good. He never saw distress without wishing to relieve it...

Francis Adams (writer) poet and journalist, wrote in connection with Feilberg's funeral at Toowong cemetery in Brisbane in October 1887:

He was a soldier in the army of Letters and of light of whom his comrades can be proud. He fixed his eyes on the abiding truth of human life – on justice and on mercy, on trust and on love – and clung to them. He felt, as so many of us feel, that the old symbols see no new ones in the world of thought and feeling of his time. All honour to the brave heart that hopeless of the proof of justification, hopeless of the old support in life and of the old hope of reward in death, bated not one jot of belief in the beauty and necessity of the good, the noble, and true!...Not with sorrow only do we think of this man, of our dear dead comrade: no, but with the love for what he was, and with the pride for what he did, that rob death of its victory and make him that was brought low as one that is raised up.

'Bobby' Byrne, or John Edgar Byrne (1842–1906), a Londoner turned bushman and pioneer during the Gulf country rush in the 1860s, later journalist and owner-editor of the Queensland Figaro and Punch, simply stated, in the plain and rather understated style of a nineteenth-century Australian bushman (take note that he used first-name, highly unusual for this period):

Carl was a mate of mine of some 16 years' standing. The Brisbane dailies supply full particulars of his life, and it is not for me to gush about his virtues. He was my mate, and I always found him 'white.'(*) I first met him in Maryborough, when he had just come back from the Barcoo, where he had been jackarooing. Some of the best yarns that ever appeared in Punch and Figaro I learned from Carl Feilberg...

(*) For an Australian 'bushman' to call another man 'white' was the greatest honour in those days, equivalent of saying that he was something like a plain, genuine and upright man of the highest personal integrity. It was used even on black people at times, one example is the black Danish West Indian, turned Australian heavy weight boxer, Peter Jackson (boxer) (1861–1901) who was called a 'real whiteman'.

Journalism, fiction and other literary contributions
Carl Feilberg's main strength was his work as a political commentator and leader-writer for amongst others the Wide Bay and Burnett News (c. October 1870 to 1875, unfortunately no issues available from this period), Cooktown Courier (from September 1876 to June 1877), the Queensland Patriot (from February 1878 to January 1879), The Brisbane Courier and its weekly the Queenslander (sporadically in the period 1875 – February 1878, intensively from January 1879– January 1881 & July 1883– September 1887) and Melbourne Argus (Brisbane correspondent from 1880 to 1882, sub-editor on amongst others the subject of Queensland & New Guinea from July 1882 – June 1883). He was the author behind the parliamentary column of the 'Political Froth' by 'the Abstainer' and the column 'Specialities' in the Queenslander from January 1879 – to May 1882, and political commentaries such as 'The future of North-Eastern Australia'. 
Next to this and in his spare time Feilberg wrote fiction and several sketches among which was some often surprisingly naive and romantic short stories, and also a small adventure novel (A Strange Exploring Trip) which some contemporaries viewed as having a curious resemblance with Henry Rider Haggard's later King Solomon's Mines (from 1885), while it was probably inspired by Jonathan Swift's Gulliver's Travels (from 1726). He naturally used personal experiences in several of his stories from the outer Barcoo and early Rockhampton in the late 1860s, and from Cooktown and the Palmer gold field in the 1870s. His short-stories were exceedingly popular in his own time. The Illustrated Sydney News of December 1886 thus announced him as 'Mr Carl Feilberg, the inimitable story-teller of Queensland'. Some of these sketches and stories were signed 'CF' but several were not signed at all (his authorship was revealed in the writings by various contemporaries). Below is a representative sample:
 
 ‘Some Queensland Pioneers’ a series of ten articles by 'CF' (30 December 1882 to 30 June 1883) in The Australasian (weekly Melbourne Argus).
 'A Strange Exploring Trip' – Chapter I-XVIII by 'Old Harry', a small serialised novel in the Saturday edition of the Brisbane Courier (and the Queenslander) onwards from 15 April to 7 October 1876.
 'To The Red Barcoo' by '* * *' Queenslander Supplement, 24 February 1877, pp. 1d-4a.
 'Miami – A Tale told by the Sea' by 'CF' Queenslander Christmas Supplement,' 22 December 1877, pp. 10–11.
 'Dividing Mates' by 'CF' Queenslander Christmas Supplement,' 14 December 1878.
 'Jeannie' by 'CF' Queenslander Christmas Supplement,' 20 December 1879, pp. 1–3.
 'Drift' by 'CF' Queenslander Christmas Supplement,' 25 December 1880, pp. 10–12.
 'Our Friend the Captain' by 'CF' – a story about a charming Central Queensland bushranger Queenslander 'Christmas Supplement' 19 December 1885, pp. 7–8.
 'A Curl of a Woman's Hair' by 'Carl Feilberg', Illustrated Sydney News, Christmas Edition, December 1886.
 'My Mate's Locket' by Carl A. Feilberg, about the life of a Danish migrant (fiction) is the only story actually printed in book-form, it appears in Turner, Charles (Illustrator): Australian Stories in Prose and Verse, Melbourne (Cameron, Laing) 1882, 105 pages, ill., an anthology of fourteen stories by (cit.) 'leading Australian writers, viz Frank Morley, Henry Kendall, Marcus Clarke, N. Walter Swan, R. P. Whitworth, Donald Cameron, Carl A. Feilberg, Charles Turner, and Janet Carrol.’

A few stories, in some cases half finished, were later sold from Feilberg's estate and printed after his death in the radical journal the Queensland Boomerang, they were:  
 ‘Camp Fire Yarns’, 3 December 1887.
 ‘Attacked by the Blacks’, 17 December 1887.
 ‘The Evil Eye’, 24 December 1887 and 7 January 1888.
 ‘His Colonial Experience’, 4 February 1888 and 11 March 1888.

Legacy
Carl Feilberg was arguably the most prominent political commentator and newspaper editor in Queensland in his time, but he was certainly equally well known in the other Australian colonies. His death in October 1887 was received with an amount of strongly worded obituaries and expressions of grief, which was to remain extraordinary as well as unprecedented for any Queensland journalist of his era.

Yet it so happened that his most lasting legacy became the numerous articles he wrote dealing with the most painful issue of all – Queensland's frontier indigenous policy, Native Police system, and what he continually argued was an urgent need for the government to reform and move to protect the fundamental rights of indigenous people. An issue which was to remain unsolved, contested and a painful legacy that even his closest friends would prefer to forget rather than to remember.

Indeed, Carl Feilberg is beyond question the most outstanding and one of the most frequently cited advocate of indigenous human rights in the history of colonial Queensland, and he certainly belongs in the ranks of the most notable of his kind in the history of colonial Australia. Almost all indigenous policy critical articles, editorial comments and editorials printed in the Brisbane Courier and its weekly The Queenslander between 1874 and 1886 were authored by Carl Feilberg. Additionally he conducted two lengthy campaigns, one in the Queensland Patriot in 1878 and the other and most notable in the Queenslander in 1880., both of them (but the latter, in particular), triggering significant public and parliamentary debates centred around the issue of the colony's Native Police Force and frontier indigenous policy. Yet still, there are very few people whose writings and the response created that are more frequently cited today, yet there is probably no one whose name and personal history has been more thoroughly forgotten. It is almost as if someone set out to illustrate the wording of late Professor Bill Stanner (1905–1981) about 'the great Australian silence' and 'the cult of disremembering'.

See also
Jackaroo (trainee)

Notes

References
 Browne, Reginald Spencer: A Journalist's Memories, Read Press, Brisbane 1927.
 Cryle, Denis: The Press In Colonial Queensland: A Social and Political History 1845–1875, Brisbane 1995.
 Davies, Alfred G.: Queensland's Pioneer Journals and Journalists, Historical Society of Queensland Journal (RHSQ) vol 3, No 4, 1936–47, p265-283.
 Evans, Raymond: A History of Queensland, Cambridge 2007, 321 pages, ill.
 Feilberg, Carl Adolph: Prize essay on Queensland: Queensland, its resources and prospects. Pamphlet published by National Association of Queensland, Brisbane 1879, 25 pages.
 Feilberg, Carl Adolph: The Colony of Queensland, 24 pages essay written for the ‘Catalogue of the Queensland Court of the International Exhibition’, Melbourne 1880, enclosed statistics and a thorough description of the Queensland stand (Mitchell Library DSM/ 042/ P176).
 Feilberg, Carl Adolph (anonymous): The Way We Civilise; Black and White; The Native Police: – A series of articles and letters reprinted from the ‘Queenslander’ (Brisbane, December 1880)
 Mennell, Philip Dearman: The Dictionary of Australasian Biography, comprising notice of eminent colonists from the inauguration of responsible government down to the present time 1855–1892. London 1892.
 Ørsted-Jensen: Robert: The Right To Live – The Politics of Race and the Troubled Conscience of an Australian Journalist Vol I-II (yet unpublished manuscript – main biographical reference).
 Ørsted-Jensen: Robert: Frontier History Revisited: Colonial Queensland and the 'History War', Brisbane 2011, 284 pages, ill. 
 Reynolds, Henry: This Whispering In Our Hearts, Sydney 1998, chapter 6, The Crusade of the Queenslander.
 Reynolds, Henry: This Whispering In Our Hearts Revisited, Sydney 2018, chapter 6, The Crusade of the Queenslander.
 Reynolds, Henry: An Indelible Stain?, Sydney 2001, chapter 7, Dispersing the Blacks.
 Rusden, G.W.: History of Australia, vol 1–3, second edition Melbourne 1897, Vol 3 pp. 146–56 & 235.
 Thorne, Ebenezer: Queen Of The Colonies, or, Queensland as I knew it – by An Eight Years’ Resident, Publ. Sampson & Low London, 1876, 352 pages.

Recommended further reading
 Evans, R., Saunders, K. and Cronin, K.: Race Relations in Colonial Queensland: A History of Exclusion, Exploitation and Extermination, third edition Brisbane 1993 (first edition publ. Sydney, 1975), 456 pages, ill.
 Reid, Gordon:	A Nest of Hornets: The Massacre of the Fraser family at Hornet Bank Station, Central Queensland, 1857, and related events, Melbourne 1982, 235 pages ill. (notes, but not indexed).
 Loos, Noel Anthony: Invasion And Resistance: Aboriginal-European Relations On The North Queensland Frontier 1861–1897, Canberra 1982, 323 pages, ill.
 Wright, Judith Arundell: The Cry For The Dead, Melbourne 1981, 303 pages.
 Stanner, Bill (William Edward Hanley): The Dreaming & other Essays'', Melbourne 2009, 290 pages, a collection of Essays (which includes the 1968 Boyer lecture above) introduced by Robert Manne.

External links 

 The Way We Civilise A series of articles and letters Reprinted from the 'Queenslander' (Brisbane, December 1880)
 Feilberg, Carl Adolf – Brisbane City Council Grave Location Search
 The opening (but not the first) article in the Queenslander'''s 1880 campaign], as it appeared in this journal at the time of event.
 Carl Feilberg (1844-1887) The 2018 Induction Article for Feilberg into the Australian Media Hall of Fame'' by Robert Ørsted-Jensen [http://halloffame.melbournepressclub.com/article/carl-feilberg

1844 births
1887 deaths
Australian indigenous rights activists
Australian newspaper editors
Danish emigrants to Australia
19th-century Australian journalists
19th-century Australian male writers
Burials at Toowong Cemetery
19th-century male writers
Carl Adolph Feilberg
The Argus (Melbourne) people
Australian male journalists